Diplomatic Enclave Area is a neighbourhood in Brunei-Muara District, Brunei, as well as the capital Bandar Seri Begawan. The population was 85 in 2016. It is one of the villages within Mukim Kianggeh. The postcode is BA2313.

Infrastructures  

 Embassy of the Philippines
 Embassy of the United States
 Embassy of China
 Embassy of Laos
 Embassy of Cambodia
 Embassy of South Korea
 Embassy of Indonesia
 Malaysian High Commission

See also 
 List of neighbourhoods in Bandar Seri Begawan

References 

Villages in Brunei-Muara District
Neighbourhoods in Bandar Seri Begawan